Keith Nolan may refer to:

 Keith W. Nolan (1964–2009), American military historian
 Keith Nolan (golfer) (born 1973), Irish golfer